The Spokane & International Railroad Construction Camp near Eastport, Idaho dates from 1905 when grading and construction of the Spokane & International Railroad began in this area.  The railroad became operational in 1906.  The site was listed on the National Register of Historic Places in 1994.

It was a construction camp on the Spokane & International Railroad, which later became part of the Burlington Northern Railroad.  It has also been known as Chinese Ovens site (10-BY-372) and also as site IHSI 21-15699.

The listed area included two contributing structures and six contributing sites.

It was the location of institutional housing.

References

National Register of Historic Places in Boundary County, Idaho
Buildings and structures completed in 1905
1905 establishments in Idaho